Manuel Sánchez Torres (born 1 January 1960) is a Spanish retired footballer who played as a forward.

Almost all of his professional career was spent in the Netherlands, where he appeared for three different teams – mainly Twente – and played in nearly 250 official games.

Football career
Torres was born in Terrassa, Barcelona, Catalonia. When he was seven years old he moved with his parents to Almelo in the Netherlands, and he started his football career at local amateurs PH Almelo, being subsequently noticed and signed by Eredivisie club FC Twente.

On 17 September 1978, aged 18, Torres made his league debut for Twente, in a home game against Sparta Rotterdam, scoring his first goal a few weeks later at HFC Haarlem and ending his first season with three goals in 23 matches as the Enschede side finished in 11th position and reached the final of the Dutch Cup, lost to league champions AFC Ajax.

From 1980 onwards, Sánchez Torres scored in double digits in every season at Twente, safe for the 1982–83 campaign which ended in relegation to the second division – followed by immediate promotion, with player netting 11 times for the runners-up.

In 1985, Torres returned to his country and signed for Valencia CF, making his debut for the Che against Real Valladolid. During his spell with the club, where he was coached by Alfredo Di Stéfano, he failed to reproduce his previous form, scoring only once and also suffering La Liga relegation in his first season.

After leaving Valencia, Sánchez Torres returned to the Netherlands and joined Roda JC in the top division, but appeared sparingly for that and his following teams, NEC Nijmegen and Heracles Almelo (no games whatsoever for the latter), due to injury, retiring from football in 1993 at age 33.

Club statistics

References

External links
Stats at Voetbal International 
NEC fan archives 

CiberChe stats and bio 

1960 births
Living people
Footballers from Terrassa
Spanish footballers
Association football forwards
Eredivisie players
Eerste Divisie players
FC Twente players
Roda JC Kerkrade players
NEC Nijmegen players
Heracles Almelo players
La Liga players
Segunda División players
Valencia CF players
Spanish expatriate footballers
Expatriate footballers in the Netherlands
Spanish expatriate sportspeople in the Netherlands